Henrys Fork is a  long tributary of the Green River in Utah and Wyoming. Originating in the Uinta Mountains of Utah, the river flows north into Wyoming, where it turns east, passing Lonetree, Burntfork, and McKinnon. Near Manila, Utah, the river loops back south into Utah, emptying into the Flaming Gorge Reservoir where it joins the Green River.

The major tributaries of Henrys Fork are Beaver Creek and Burnt Fork, which both rise in the Uinta Mountains. Water from the river is used primarily to irrigate pasture.

Henry's Fork is believed to be named for Andrew Henry. The first annual rendezvous was held in 1825 along the river.

See also

 List of rivers of Utah
 List of rivers of Wyoming

References

Rivers of Wyoming
Rivers of Utah
Rivers of Uinta County, Wyoming
Rivers of Sweetwater County, Wyoming
Rivers of Daggett County, Utah
Tributaries of the Green River (Colorado River tributary)
Tributaries of the Colorado River in Utah
Tributaries of the Colorado River in Wyoming